Actaplanin is a complex of broad-spectrum antibiotics made by Actinoplanes bacteria. Research carried out by a group in Eli Lilly and Co. in 1984 identified several actaplanins using high-performance liquid chromatography. Actaplanins A, B1, B2, B3, C1 and G were shown to be composed of the same peptide core, an amino sugar, and varying amounts of glucose, mannose, and rhamnose.

See also
 Ristocetin (contains the same amino sugar as in actaplanin)

References

Antibiotics
Glycopeptide antibiotics